

Osijek 
 Archaeological Museum Osijek
 Gallery of Fine Arts, Osijek
 Gallery Waldinger
 Museum of Slavonia

Split 
 Froggyland
 Gallery of Fine Arts, Split
 Ivan Meštrović Gallery
 Split Archaeological Museum
 Museum of Croatian Archaeological Monuments
 Split City Museum
 Split Science Museum and Zoo

Zagreb 
 Archaeological Museum, Zagreb
 Art Pavilion in Zagreb
 Croatian History Museum
 Croatian Museum of Naïve Art
 Croatian Natural History Museum
 Croatian Railway Museum
 Croatian School Museum
 Ethnographic Museum
 Ferdinand Budicki Automobile Museum
 Glyptotheque (Zagreb)
 Institute for Contemporary Art, Zagreb
 Klovićevi dvori
 Lauba
 Meštrović Atelier
 Meštrović Pavilion
 Mimara Museum
 Modern Gallery
 Museum of Arts and Crafts, Zagreb
 Museum of Broken Relationships
 Museum of Contemporary Art, Zagreb
 Mushroom Museum
 Nikola Tesla Technical Museum
 Strossmayer Gallery of Old Masters
 Zagreb City Museum

Others 
 Cultural and Scientific Center "Milutin Milanković"
 Dubrovnik Natural History Museum
 Eltz Manor
 Franciscan Church and Monastery (Dubrovnik)
 Krapina Neanderthal Museum
 Marton Museum
 Međimurje County Museum housed in Čakovec Castle
 Museum of the Cetinska Krajina Region
 Nehaj Fortress
 Nikola Tesla Memorial Center
 Oršić Castle in Gornja Stubica
 Ozalj Castle
 Pazin Castle
 Pejačević Castle in Virovitica
 Rector's Palace, Dubrovnik
 Rijeka Cathedral
 Sisak Fortress
 Trakošćan Castle
 Varaždin City Museum
 Veliki Tabor Castle
 Vučedol Culture Museum

Defunct
 Museum of Serbs of Croatia (1946–1963, became part of Croatian History Museum)

See also

 List of museums
 Tourism in Croatia

References

Museums
 
Croatia
Museums
Museums
Croatia